St. Philip's Episcopal Church is an historic Episcopal church located at 129 West Mound Street in Circleville, Ohio. The first Episcopal service in Circleville was held on May 26, 1817, by the Rev. Philander Chase, who in 1819 became the first bishop of the Episcopal Diocese of Ohio. The stone church building was built in 1866 in a mixed Gothic and Tudor Revival style and was consecrated in 1868.  Besides its actual name, the church has been known as the "Little Church on the Mound," because it sits on the base of what was formerly one of Circleville's numerous Native American mounds that was historically known as "Mount Gilboa."

In 1918, the church was modified by the construction of a Tudor Revival structure that has since been used as a parish hall.  Despite this addition, the church's historic integrity was not damaged, as both its Gothic Revival style and the addition's Tudor Revival style are meant to resemble older English structures.  In recognition of its well-preserved historic architecture, St. Philip's was listed on the National Register of Historic Places in 1986.

St. Philip's today is an active parish in the Episcopal Diocese of Southern Ohio. The Rev. David E. Getreu is the 43rd Rector.

References

External links
 St. Philip's Episcopal Church website

Churches completed in 1866
19th-century Episcopal church buildings
Buildings and structures in Pickaway County, Ohio
Circleville, Ohio
Episcopal churches in Ohio
National Register of Historic Places in Pickaway County, Ohio
Churches on the National Register of Historic Places in Ohio
1866 establishments in Ohio